Paul Robert Mackness  (born 1973) is the Archdeacon of St Davids since March 2018.

Mackness was educated at the University of Wales, Lampeter, and studied for the priesthood at St Michael's College, Llandaff; and was ordained deacon in 2001, priest in 2002  After a curacy at Llanelli  he was Rector of Manordeifi from 2004 to 2010, then Vicar of Haverfordwest until 2014. He was Bishop's Chaplain and Clerical Secretary in the Diocese of St Davids from April 2014 until July 2018. He was collated archdeacon on 22 March 2018.

References

1973 births
University of Wales, Lampeter
Archdeacons of St Davids
Church in Wales archdeacons
21st-century Welsh Anglican priests
Living people